The Canton of Royère-de-Vassivière was a canton situated in the Creuse département and in the Limousin region of central France. It was disbanded following the French canton reorganisation which came into effect in March 2015. It had 1,796 inhabitants (2012).

Geography 
An area of farming, forestry and quarrying, with the town of Royère-de-Vassivière, in the arrondissement of Aubusson, at its centre. The altitude varies from 363m (Saint-Moreil) to 829m (Royère-de-Vassivière)  with an average altitude of 619m.

The canton comprised 7 communes:
Le Monteil-au-Vicomte
Royère-de-Vassivière
Saint-Junien-la-Bregère
Saint-Martin-Château
Saint-Moreil
Saint-Pardoux-Morterolles
Saint-Pierre-Bellevue

Population

See also 
 Arrondissements of the Creuse department
 Cantons of the Creuse department
 Communes of the Creuse department

References

Royere-de-Vassiviere
2015 disestablishments in France
States and territories disestablished in 2015